St Joseph's School, Mabiri is a Marist Brothers school on Bougainville Island, the main island of the Autonomous Region of Bougainville of Papua New Guinea.

Funding 
The school receives funding from government and non-government organizations, including Australian Aid from Australia and other countries. They have also been helped by Australian Marist students and schools, including St Joseph's College, Hunters Hill and Champagnat Catholic College Pagewood.

See also

 Catholic Church in Papua New Guinea
 Education in Papua New Guinea
 List of schools in Papua New Guinea

References

External links
  MAPS (marist asia-pacific solidarity) on Bougainville

Catholic Church in the Autonomous Region of Bougainville
Educational institutions with year of establishment missing
Autonomous Region of Bougainville
Marist Brothers schools
Catholic schools in Papua New Guinea